, also romanized as Senryuu Shojo, is a Japanese manga series written and illustrated by Masakuni Igarashi. The series was serialized in Kodansha's Weekly Shōnen Magazine from October 2016 to April 2020, and has been compiled into thirteen tankōbon volumes. An anime television series adaptation by Connect aired from April to June 2019.

Plot
The story focuses on the relationship between Nanako Yukishiro, a girl who only communicates through senryū written on tanzaku, and Eiji Busujima, an ex-delinquent who attempts to write his own senryū. The story follows their different takes on everyday life through their senryu. Most chapters take the form of a collection of yonkomas with a few more traditional pages thrown in; these tell the chapter's story when read in order.

Characters

A high school girl who is taciturn and not good with verbal communication, instead of communicating exclusively through senryu, a form of haiku. A member of the Literature club, she is deeply enamored with Eiji and is very fond and accepting of him. She is seen as clumsy and a bit of an airhead.

An ex-delinquent who develops feelings for Nanako. A member of the Literature club, he also attempts to write his own senryu despite his clear lack of talent. His slit, glaring eyes make him very intimidating to many and made him a target for other delinquents. Always seen in a gakuran with a white hoodie underneath, he is very caring towards Nanako, albeit being dense and gullible. Eiji is ranked second in terms of disconnect between their tough exterior and their club affiliation. Furthermore, Eiji dotes and adores his younger sister, Hanabi Busujima.

The president of the Literature club who is highly supportive of Nanako's attempts to woo Eiji. She loves to stalk the two in order to spy on their intimate moments. One of the highest-ranking in academics within her year group, she works multiple part-time jobs. She is also a well-accomplished novelist, though she keeps the fact hidden from both Nanako and Eiji. However, Nanako and Eiji quickly find out her secret.

 Eiji's childhood friend who is older by two years and attends the same high school as him. President of the "Modern US army combative" club, she has a very developed figure and a strong physique. Dotes on Eiji a lot and loves to tease him, as well as Nanako. While she seems to support Nanako and Eiji, she seems to have some feelings for Eiji herself. Coincidentally, Koto is ranked first in terms of disconnect between their tough exterior and their club affiliation.

 A very shy high school student who prefers to communicate through her drawings. Like Nanako, she does not speak through verbal communication. Additionally, she gets very nervous when interacting eye to eye, so she sketches out her face on her sketchpad and holds it up when communicating. 

 A gloomy and blunt high school girl famous for her highly accurate divinations as a fortune teller. She hides her identity as a fortune teller at school by parting her hair in the opposite direction. She relies on her fortune-telling for everything that she does. She has never been wrong with her fortunes.

The younger sister of Eiji Busujima. Eiji constantly dotes on her as she is young. She is seen a couple of times throughout the series and often says lines that are innocent to kids of her age, but makes things awkward for her brother and Nanako.

Media

Manga
Senryū Shōjo, written and illustrated by Masakuni Igarashi, was serialized in Kodansha's Weekly Shōnen Magazine from October 19, 2016 to April 22, 2020.

Volume list

Anime
An anime television series adaptation was announced on December 6, 2018. The series was animated by Connect, with Masato Jinbo directing and writing the series, and Maki Hashimoto designing the characters. It aired from April 6 to June 22, 2019 on the Animeism programming block on MBS, TBS, and BS-TBS. Sonoko Inoue performed the series' opening theme song , while Rikako Aida performed the series' ending theme song "Ordinary Love". Sentai Filmworks has licensed the series worldwide excluding Asia. Muse Communication licensed the anime in Southeast Asia.

Episode list

Reception
The anime adaptation generated over 100,000 copies for manga sales.

The manga has over 600,000 copies sold in print.

Notes

References

External links
Senryū Shōjo on Kodansha 
Anime official website 

2019 anime television series debuts
Anime series based on manga
Animeism
Connect (studio)
Kodansha manga
Romantic comedy anime and manga
Sentai Filmworks
Shōnen manga
Slice of life anime and manga
Muse Communication